Marko Bezjak (born 26 June 1986) is a Slovenian professional handball player for SC Magdeburg.

He was also a member of the Slovenian national team.

References

1986 births
Living people
Handball players from Ljubljana
Slovenian male handball players
Expatriate handball players
Slovenian expatriate sportspeople in Germany
Handball-Bundesliga players
Olympic handball players of Slovenia
Handball players at the 2016 Summer Olympics
SC Magdeburg players